The Broken Wing or Broken Wing may refer to:

The Broken Wing (1923 film), an American silent film starring Kenneth Harlan and Miriam Cooper
The Broken Wing (1932 film), an American sound film starring Leo Carillo
Broken Wing (EP), a 2013 EP by Alkaline Trio
The Broken Wing (play), an American play by Charles Goddard
The Broken Wing, a collection of Sarojini Naidu's poems
"Broken Wing", an episode of Cimarron Strip
"A Broken Wing", a 1997 song by Martina McBride

See also
The Broken Wings a 1962 film adaptation of the 1912 novel by Khalil Gibran
Broken Wings (disambiguation)